Iris Ashley (1909–1994) was an Irish-born British stage and film actress. She was born Iris Blanche Stafford Northcote in Trellis Cottage, Rushbrooke, Queenstown (now Cobh), County Cork to Captain Leonard Augustus Stafford Northcote and Lilian Cora Van Praagh. She made an appearance on the BBC's television game show Call My Bluff in 1968.

Filmography
 An Obvious Situation (1930)
 Never Trouble Trouble (1931)
 Poor Old Bill (1931)
 Nine Till Six (1932)
 The Lodger (1932)
 Heads We Go (1933)
 The Song You Gave Me (1933)
 The Warren Case (1934)
 Royal Cavalcade (1935)
 The Student's Romance (1935)
 Me and Marlborough (1935)
 I Give My Heart (1935)
 Blind Man's Bluff (1936)
 The Amazing Quest of Ernest Bliss (1936)

References

Bibliography
 Sweeney, Kevin. James Mason: A Bio-bibliography. Greenwood Publishing Group, 1999.

External links

1909 births
1994 deaths
British film actresses
Irish film actresses
British stage actresses
Irish stage actresses
Date of death missing